Africanus Horton (1835–1883), also known as James Beale, was ab African nationalist writer. Born of parents of the Igbo people who had been freed from a slaver ship by the Royal Navy and disembarked at Freetown, Sierra Leone, where he was born. He was an esteemed medical surgeon in the British Army. 

Africanus Horton was a surgeon, scientist, soldier, and a political thinker who worked toward African independence a century before it occurred. In his varied career, he served as a physician, an officer in the British Army, a banker, and a mining entrepreneur.  In addition, he wrote a number of books and essays, the most widely remembered of which is his 1868 Vindication of the African Race, an answer to the white racist authors emerging in Europe.  His writings look ahead to African self-government, anticipating many events of the 1950s and 1960s, and Horton is often seen as one of the founders of African nationalism and has been called "the father of modern African political thought".

He wrote a book entitled West African Countries and Peoples (1868). A crater on Mercury is named after him.

Life
Horton was born in the village of Gloucester, near to Freetown in British Sierra Leone. He was born James Horton in 1835 to the family of James Horton Sr; his father was a liberated slave of Igbo ancestry. Horton began his studies at a local school in Gloucester and in 1845, he was recruited by Reverend James Beale to attend CMS Grammar School. Thereafter, he moved to Fourah Bay Institution (later Fourah Bay College) to study divinity in the hope of becoming a clergyman. In 1855, along with William Davies and Samuel Campbell, he received a British War Office scholarship to study medicine in Great Britain. He studied at King's College London and Edinburgh University, qualifying as a medical doctor in 1859 with the thesis "On the medical topography of the west coast of Africa including sketches of its botany". While a student, he took the name "Africanus" as an emblem of pride in his African homeland. He published his dissertation, The Medical Topography of the West Coast of Africa, in 1858. Upon completion of his studies at Edinburgh, he was commissioned as an officer in the British Army and was made a Staff Assistant Surgeon becoming one of the earliest Africans in the officer cadre of the British Army. When he returned to Sierra Leone, he was posted to service in Ghana in the West India Regiment. In his army career, he was posted to various locations within the British colony, including Lagos, the Gambia, Sierra Leone and Ghana.

Politics and writings
Horton's first two publications: The Political Economy of British West Africa: with the Requirements of Several Colonies and Settlements (1865) and West African Countries and Peoples (1868) were a defense of Africans against racist views of some European anthropologists that Africans were a physically and intellectually inferior people whose development stopped centuries ago. He argued that all races have the faculty to acquire knowledge about philosophy, science and technologies that civilizations have developed over the ages. Horton was the first modern African political thinker to openly campaign for self-government for the West African colonies and champion the cause of what he referred to as "African nationality". Horton was an advocate of an elected monarchy in which a king would be elected by universal suffrage and bicameral legislature. In regards to the economic development of Sierra Leone, he proposed the annexation and commercial development of surrounding land in an effort to raise the revenue necessary to implement various economic and social development plans. In another of his publications, a compilation of letters called Letters of the Political Condition of the Gold Coast since the exchange of territory, Horton wrote about hostilities between ethnic groups in the Gold Coast and offered his views about solving the hostilities including the continuation of education in Africa.

Horton was one of the first West Africans to demand the establishment of a medical school and higher institution in the region. Horton recognised the value in an indigenous institution and believed that it should be headed by an African, believing that they would be more invested in the progress of the country than a European. In 1861, he wrote a letter to the War Office in London, stating the need of a tropical medical school in the region.

After his retirement from the army, Horton started a finance institution called the Commercial Bank of West Africa.

Works
 Horton, James Africanus B. The Political Economy of British West Africa (1865)
 —. West African Countries and Peoples, London: (1868).

Personal life
Horton married on two occasions while living in Freetown; he first married Fanny Marietta Pratt, daughter of the prominent Pratt family of Igbo origin. Marietta died at age twenty-two and Horton then on May 29, 1875, went on to marry Selina Beatrice Elliott (1851–1910), daughter of John Bucknor Elliott who was the manager of the Western Area of Freetown. The Elliotts were a Nova Scotian settler family of African-American descent.

References

Sources

Further reading
 Fyfe, Christopher. Africanus Horton Centenary'African Affairs, London: (1983); 82: 565
 "Africanus Horton: The Dawn of Nationalism in Modern Africa". Extracts from the Political, Educational and Scientific Writings of J.A.B. Horton M.D., 1835-1883 by Davidson Nicol, London: Longman Inc, 1969.

Sierra Leone Creole people
Sierra Leonean writers
Sierra Leonean people of Igbo descent
Sierra Leonean surgeons
Folklorists
1835 births
1883 deaths
Alumni of King's College London
Alumni of the University of Edinburgh
People educated at the Sierra Leone Grammar School
People from Western Area Rural District
Black British people in health professions